The 1994 Volta a la Comunitat Valenciana was the 52nd edition of the Volta a la Comunitat Valenciana road cycling stage race, which was held from 22 February to 27 February 1994. The race started in Calpe and finished in Valencia. The race was won by Viatcheslav Ekimov of the  team.

General classification

References

Volta a la Comunitat Valenciana
Volta a la Comunitat Valenciana
Volta a la Comunitat Valenciana